Gosford Forest Park is a forest park located outside Markethill, County Armagh, Northern Ireland. The park, previously Gosford Demesne, was acquired by the Department of Agriculture in 1958 and comprises some 240 hectares of diverse woodland and open parkland.  Gosford Forest Park is also home to Gosford Castle. It was designated the first conservation forest in Northern Ireland in 1986.

Facilities

Facilities available include:
 Camping and Caravanning Site (with mains electricity)
 Picnic and Barbecue areas
 Tea House and Shop
 Way-marked Trails
 Horse-riding routes
 Orienteering routes
 Disabled facilities
 Bookable Guided Tours
 Special events (arranged by permit)
 Function Hall

History

In the early 17th century the Acheson family came to the Markethill area, and built a very substantial farmhouse near the present town of Markethill. The family came from Monmouthshire and, in fact, the present Earl of Weymes is related to the Achesons who later became the Earls of Gosford. When they came here first they brought with them 13 families, and some of the family names still survive in the area, notably Galbraith, Greer, etc. One of the two forts (or raths) in Gosford Forest was named after the Greer family who farmed the land in that area.

The first dwelling place of the Achesons was burned down; this house was near the town of Markethill which the family were responsible for founding. In 1610 the family were granted the lands of the present estate. They proceeded to build another house using locally procured, hand-made, red brick. This house was named Clonkearney Manor after the townland in which it was built. The path to this site is up near the ponds, but unfortunately only a portion of the red brick foundations is now visible. This house was reputed to have been burned down during the Williamite wars in the mid-17th century.

The estate is now owned by the Forest Service and boasts excellent facilities and a cafe. It also houses one of Northern Ireland's premier collections of rare breeds. Gosford Castle has just been renovated into 23 new homes which are currently being sold.

In 1989, Gosford Forest Park hosted the Irish Scout Jamboree, "Gosford '89", which was attended by over 3,000 scouts from around the world, including contingents from Canada, Japan and the United States.

References

External links
History of Gosford Castle with Pictures

Forests and woodlands of Northern Ireland
Parks in County Armagh